Deadly Venoms is an American Wu-Tang Clan-affiliated all-female hip hop group formed in 1997 consisting of N-Tyce, J-Boo, Champ MC, and Finesse.  X Clan-affiliated rapper Lin Que was initially intended to be part of the group but departed soon after its inception due to business decisions. Each member of the group were experienced rappers prior to joining the collective. Finesse recorded an album with rapper Synquis named Soul Sisters in 1988, Champ released her debut album Ghetto Flava on East West America/Atlantic Records, and N-Tyce was signed to Wild Pitch/EMI in the mid 1990s and released a few singles including the RZA-produced "Hush Hush Tip" featuring Method Man. The Deadly Venoms was J-Boo's professional introduction.

A legal dispute with A&M/PolyGram Records and the then-forthcoming merger between the MCA and PolyGram families of labels that formed the Universal Music Group forced its debut album, Antidote, to remain in its vaults, although the single “One More to Go”  (featuring Inspectah Deck, Method Man, Cappadonna, Street Life, and GZA) b/w “Bomb Threat,” was released and the album was later leaked. Despite not being properly released, the album got positive reviews. The group was also featured on NBA All-Star and rapper Shaquille O'Neal's 1998 album Respect. Deadly Venoms' second album, Pretty Thugs, was also never properly released because of similar label disputes, this time with DreamWorks/Interscope/Universal Records.  However, as with Antidote, copies of the record were leaked, and a promo CD was pressed.

After the departure of Finesse due to undisclosed business reasons, the group finally managed to release an album with 2002's Still Standing, on Rocks the World/Caroline/Virgin/EMI Records.

Discography
 (1998) Antidote (unreleased)
 (2000) Pretty Thugs (unreleased)
 (2002) Still Standing

Track listings
1998: The Antidote (A&M/PolyGram Records 540 962, unreleased)
01. Intro - 
02. One More To Go (The Earthquake) (featuring Inspectah Deck, Method Man, GZA, Cappadonna, and Street Life) (Produced by Russ Prez)
03. Drug Free (Free Ol' Dirty) ( featuring Ol' Dirty Bastard and Shorty Shit Stain) (Produced by Storm)
04. Counterfeiters 
05. Ladies Room 
06. What, What 
07. Pockets Stay Deeply 
08. The Way We Feel 
09. D-Evils 
10. Word Life 
11. Everything 
12. Ring-Bells Posse (The Symphony/PYN Symphony) (featuring  M.M.O. and K.G.B.) (Produced by Storm)
13. Formulate 
14. Slice Like Swords 
15. Ready (featuring Tekitha)
16. Rap Scholar (Madd Long) (featuring La the Darkman and Jamie Sommers) (Produced by RZA)

17. Hidden Bonus Track
18. Hidden Bonus Track

2000: Pretty Thugs (DreamWorks/Interscope/Universal Records 450 244, unreleased)
01. Chedda Intro 
02. Party Chedda/Venom Interlude (featuring Ill Knob)
03. Venom Everywhere 
04. You Do The Things 
05. Worldwide 
06. Sunrise 
07. Don't Give Up 
08. Wrong Place/Breaker 
09. Rocks The World (featuring K.G.B.)
10. Who Got Ya Back?
11. This Is For/Breaker 
12. Pillow Talk 
13. Pretty Thugs 
14. Public Service 
15. What's The Deal? <small>(featuring Tekitha)</small>
16. Black Out/Goodnight

2002: Still Standing (Rocks the World/Caroline/Virgin/EMI Records 8236 6 60001 2 8, 2002)
01. The Perfect Storm (Produced by Storm)
02. Remember The Name (featuring Riggamortis) (Produced by Lexx)
03. 50 Bars And Better (Produced by Storm)
04. Boys In The Back (Produced by Storm)
05. Gets No Better (Produced by Storm)
06. Don't Care (Produced by Storm)
07. Love Me (featuring Daze) (Produced by Storm)
08. All Nighter (Produced by Ski)
09. Look Into My Eyes (featuring Taunja) (Produced by Storm)
10. Like What (Produced by Storm)
11. Can't See Me (Produced by Storm)
12. Hunting Season (Produced by Smokin Joeh)
13. Don't Stop (feg M.M.O.) (Produced by Storm)
14. Real Hardcore (Produced by Storm)
15. Real Niggaz (featuring 40 Glocc, Ill Knob and Whiteboy) (Produced by Smokin Joeh)
16. Chasing Dreams (Produced by Storm)

Promos
2002: Remember The Name01. Remember The Name - (dirty)02. Remember The Name - (radio)03. Remember The Name - (instrumental)04. Like What- (radio)05. Like What - (instrumental)06. Hunting Season - (dirty)''

Singles
1998: "One More to Go"
1999: "Venom Everywhere"
2000: "Don't Give Up"

Features
 Kurupt ft. Deadly Venoms - It's Time
 Shaka Amazulu The 7th ft. Deadly Venoms - Ardipithecus Ramidus
 Shaka Amazulu The 7th ft. Deadly Venoms - Marima (Floyd 2)
 Shaq ft. Deadly Venoms & K-Raw - The Bomb, Baby

References

Wu-Tang Clan affiliates
East Coast hip hop groups
A&M Records artists
DreamWorks Records artists
Women hip hop groups
Caroline Records artists
American women rappers
African-American women rappers